LP5 is the untitled fifth studio album by English electronic music duo Autechre, released on 13 July 1998 on Warp. No title was printed anywhere within the artwork, in line with the later EP EP7; it has also been called Autechre, as well as Album, as listed on promotional copies.

With the album, Autechre began abandoning the considerably warm and organic sounds of earlier albums like Amber in favor of a fine-tuned, technical style they had begun exploring on Chiastic Slide and the Cichlisuite EP, while also incorporating influences from electroacoustic music.

Production
The track "Drane2" is a response to Aphex Twin's "Bucephalus Bouncing Ball", which, according to Sean Booth, is an answer to Autechre's earlier track "Drane":"yeah we did the track drane, which had that exponential speeding-up delay thing happening, and then rich did that bouncing ball track, and we answered it with drane2 which was the same delay trick but feeding percussion into it instead, as a kind of tease"

Several technical facts about the album's production are known from an AMA conducted in 2013 on the electronic music site "We Are The Music Makers": synths used on the album include the Nord Lead 1, Yamaha DX100, and Ensoniq ASR-10; the first half of "Vose In" was made using the Nord Lead's drum maps and its ending was programmed in SoundEdit 16; finally, the complex rhythms of "Under BOAC" were programmed in Logic Pro rather than in Max.

Critical reception

Greg Prato of AllMusic gave the album 4.5 out of 5 stars and said that "all the songs are cut from the same sonic cloth". Pitchfork listed LP5 at number eight on its 2017 list of "The 50 Best IDM Albums of All Time", one of three Autechre albums to be included; reviewer Mark Richardson stated that the album effectively balances the accessibility of their earlier work with the more challenging material to come, and thus represents "a certain peak."

Track listing

On US pressings, the hidden track is moved to its own 12th track, and the silence after "Drane2" is shortened by three minutes. The hidden track is not found on vinyl pressings.

Charts

References

Autechre albums
1998 albums
Warp (record label) albums